National Movement for Development and Reform, more commonly known as Al-Hal or the Solution, is a political party in Iraq. The party is a Sunni-based party.

There are branches in the following governorates: Baghdad, Anbar, Salah ad Din, Diyala, Nineveh, Kirkuk, and Dhi Qar.

Jamal Al-Karboli is the Secretary-General.

In the 2009 Iraqi governorate elections, it won 3 seats in Al Anbar. In the 2010 Iraqi parliamentary election, it joined the Iraqiyya coalition and was allocated 13 of their 91 seats.

References

External links
Official website
Islamic political parties in Iraq
Liberal parties in Iraq